Beastly Tales is a 1991 collection of ten fables in poetry  written by Vikram Seth (UK , also US ).
Its full title is Beastly Tales from Here and There and, in the introduction, Seth states
"the first two come from India, the next two from China, the next two from Greece, the next two from the Ukraine. The final two came directly to me from the Land of Gup".

Seth's sense of humour is exemplified by his retelling of the well-known fable of The Hare and The Tortoise (p. 43). In his version the loser, being a celebrity, is feted and the winner ignored.

Contents
 The Crocodile and the Monkey
 The Louse and the Mosquito
 The Mouse and the Snake
 The Rat and the Ox
 The Eagle and the Beetle
 The Hare and the Tortoise
 The Cat and the Cock
 The Goat and the Ram
 The Frog and the Nightingale
 The Elephant and the Tragopan

Adaptions
Poems from the book have been performed by Naseeruddin Shah, Ratna Pathak, Heeba Shah, and Kenneth Desai.

References

Indian English poetry collections
Poetry by Vikram Seth
1991 poetry books
Viking Press books